"Knees Up Mother Brown" is a pub song, believed to date back as early as the 1800s, but first published in 1938, and with origins in the East End of London.

With its origins in public houses of East London, it was associated with Cockney culture. At the end of the First World War, it is documented to have been sung widely in London on 11 November 1918 (Armistice Night). The 1938 version was attributed to Bert Lee, Harris Weston and I. Taylor. During the Second World War it was performed frequently by Elsie and Doris Waters. It was also later performed on television by Noel Harrison and Petula Clark.

The expression "knees up" means to have a 'party' or 'a dance' - usually accompanied by drinking.

Lyrics
The most familiar version of the song is:

Knees up Mother Brown
Knees up Mother Brown
Under the table you must go
Ee-aye, Ee-aye, Ee-aye-oh
If I catch you bending
I'll saw your legs right off
Knees up, knees up
don't get the breeze up
Knees up Mother Brown

Other less common variations include:
'Ee-aye Ee-aye,
don't get a bree-aye'
In place of the more common: 
'Knees up, knees up
don't get the breeze up

A final, partly self-parodying refrain is often added as a chorus, particularly during a merry session at a pub or party:

Oh my, what a rotten song
What a rotten song
What a rotten song
Oh my, what a rotten song
 What a rotten song (OR And what a rotten singer too-oo-oo!)

There also exists a version of the song for children, with accompanying dance. The lyrics are :

There came a girl from France
Who didn't know how to dance
The only thing that she could do was
Knees up Mother Brown

Oh, knees up Mother Brown
Knees up Mother Brown
Knees up, knees up, never let the breeze up
Knees up Mother Brown

Oh, hopping on one foot
Hopping on one foot
Hopping, hopping, never stopping
Hopping on one foot

Oh, knees up Mother Brown
Knees up Mother Brown
Knees up, knees up, never let the breeze up
Knees up Mother Brown

Oh, hopping on the other
Hopping on the other
Hopping, hopping, never stopping
Hopping on the other

And whirling round and round
Whirling round and round
Whirling, whirling, never twirling
Whirling round and round

In popular culture 
The song is associated with West Ham United Football Club, with fans singing the song at the Boleyn Ground from at least the 1950s. It is also the name of an internet forum related to the club.

In the 1964 Disney film Mary Poppins the song "Step in Time" written by the Sherman Brothers was based on Knees Up Mother Brown. According to Richard Sherman, the Knees Up Mother Brown dance was taught to Walt Disney, Tony Walton, and others by Peter Ellenshaw (the Disney Studio's head of special effects) and the Sherman Brothers witnessed them doing the dance and got the idea for "Step in Time".

In 1965 Bing Crosby and Rosemary Clooney sang an updated version on their album That Travelin' Two-Beat.

On the 1971 Monty Python album Another Monty Python Record, the song is described as one of the "folk songs of the Spanish Inquisition."  As performed by Cardinals Ximénez (Michael Palin), Biggles (Terry Jones), and Fang (Terry Gilliam), the lyrics are altered to "Knees upon the ground" and it closes out the album's last track.

In 1980 Fozzie Bear performed this song in an episode of The Muppet Show with his mother, Emily, portraying "Mother Brown."

In her 1983 television concert special filmed at London's Dominion Theatre, Dolly Parton is shown singing the song with a group of men in a pub during the opening credits.

In the 1986 movie Sweet Liberty, Michael Caine's character, Elliot James, recounts a tale of singing "Knees Up Mother Brown" on the streets of London during World War II.  He runs into Winston Churchill, who joins in the singing.

In the 1999 movie "The Talented Mr Ripley", Jack Davenport's character, Peter attempts to cheer up Tom (played by Matt Damon) by playing a bit of the tune on the piano.

A version with ribald lyrics playing off the "blackout" regulations in WWII-era London is quoted both in Ken Follet's book Eye of the Needle (1978) and Laura Wilson's The Lover (2004).

In S5E10 of Frasier, the crowd at Daphne's pub, the Fox and Whistle, requests 'Knees Up Mother Brown' from the piano player.

The song is occasionally used in the Viz strip "Cockney Wanker", along with other typical music hall songs associated with cockneys.

In the 2022 movie Enola Holmes 2, Helena Bonham Carter’s character is briefly shown teaching the song to her daughter in a flashback.

References

External links
 Elsie & Doris Waters - Knees Up Mother Brown (1940) at YouTube

British folk songs
Drinking songs
1938 songs
Association football songs and chants